Ronalds Ķēniņš (born February 28, 1991) is a Latvian professional ice hockey forward currently playing for Lausanne HC of the National League (NL). He previously played for the Vancouver Canucks of the National Hockey League (NHL).

Playing career
Ķēniņš played junior hockey in Latvia and Switzerland. At 17 years of age, he started his professional career with GCK Lions of the National League B (NLB), Switzerland's second-tier league, in 2008–09. After three seasons with the Lions organization, Ķēniņš joined ZSC Lions of the top-tier National League A (NLA). Following the 2012–13 season, he was signed by the Vancouver Canucks on July 30, 2013. He remained in Switzerland for the 2013–14 season and recorded an NLA career-high eight goals and 25 points in 39 games.

Ķēniņš moved to North America for the 2014–15 season and was assigned to the Canucks' American Hockey League (AHL) affiliate, the Utica Comets. After being called up midway through the season, Ķēniņš made his NHL debut on January 30, 2015, against the Buffalo Sabres (a team that featured fellow Latvian Zemgus Girgensons and the former Latvian national team's head coach, Ted Nolan). The following game, Ķēniņš scored his first career NHL goal against Devan Dubnyk of the Minnesota Wild on February 1, 2015. On April 17, Ķēniņš scored his first career Stanley Cup playoff goal on a one-timer assisted by linemate and fellow rookie Bo Horvat.

On August 17, 2016, Ķēniņš agreed as a free agent to a two-year contract with his former team, the ZSC Lions of the NL. Ķēniņš plays with a Swiss player-license and isn't considered an import player in the NL.

On April 28, 2018, Ķēniņš signed a three-year contract worth CHF 1.8 million with fellow National League club, Lausanne HC.

International play
At the junior level, Ķēniņš played for Latvia in two IIHF World U18 Championships (second tier Division I play) and two IIHF World U20 Championships (one year in Division I and another in the top tier). He made his debut with Latvia's men's team at the 2011 IIHF World Championship and has gone on to play in 2012, 2013 and 2014. In February 2014, he played for Latvia at the 2014 Winter Olympics in Sochi.

Career statistics

Regular season and playoffs

International

References

External links
 

1991 births
Living people
Ice hockey players at the 2014 Winter Olympics
Ice hockey players at the 2022 Winter Olympics
Olympic ice hockey players of Latvia
Latvian ice hockey left wingers
Lausanne HC players
Ice hockey people from Riga
HC Sierre players
Undrafted National Hockey League players
Utica Comets players
Vancouver Canucks players
ZSC Lions players